Uruguay is a presidential republic in which the president is both the head of state and head of government. The following is a list of all the people who have held the office of President of Uruguay since 6 November 1830 (when the first constitution was adopted), with the exception of those who held the office of "President" under the National Council of Government, which served as the country's executive directory from 1955 to 1967. The first president of this list is Fructuoso Rivera, who held the office twice and once as part of the Triumvirate that ruled Uruguay from 1853 to 1854.

Most of the presidents of Uruguay have belonged to the Colorado Party, a traditionally conservative party founded by Rivera in 1836. The first free democratic elections for president were held in 1922. The current president is Luis Lacalle Pou of the National Party, who was elected for a first term in the 2019 presidential election.

Governors of Uruguay as a province

Oriental Province (1814–1817) 

Province part of the United Provinces of the Río de la Plata.

Cisplatine Province (1817–1828) 

After the Portuguese conquest of the Banda Oriental the Oriental Province became a province of the United Kingdom of Portugal, Brazil and the Algarves and a province of the Empire of Brazil after 1822.

Oriental Province (1825–1828) 

In the Congress of Florida the Oriental Province declared independence from the Empire of Brazil and reunited with the United Provinces of the Río de la Plata.

Heads of state of Uruguay as an independent country

Government and Provisional General Captaincy of the Oriental State of Uruguay (1828–1830) 

After the Preliminary Peace Convention the Oriental Province gained effective independence from the Empire of Brazil and the United Provinces of the Río de la Plata.

Oriental State of Uruguay (1830–1919) 
The Constitution of 1830 comes into force.

Oriental Republic of Uruguay (1919–present) 
The Constitution of 1918 comes into force. According to the Constitution, the president is elected by direct popular election for a term of five years. He may be re-elected any number of times, but is ineligible for immediate re-election.

Timeline

See also 
History of Uruguay
Politics of Uruguay

References

Bibliography 
 

Uruguay, List of Presidents of
List
Presidents of Uruguay, List of